Manuel Arturo Abreu (born 1991) is a Dominican artist, poet, critic, and curator from the Bronx. 
Abreu has written two books, poems, and essays, and participated in and curated group art installations. Their book Incalculable Loss is a finalist for the 2019 Oregon Book Awards: Sarah Winnemucca Award for Creative nonfiction, while their poetry collection transtrender  was a finalist for the 2018 Oregon Book Awards: Stafford/Hall Award for Poetry.
Abreu co-facilitates a free pop-up art school called home school in Portland, OR.

Education
Abreu received his BA in Linguistics from Reed College in Portland, Oregon in 2014. Their thesis was on accusative clitic doubling in Dominican Spanish.

Writing 
In addition to two books of poetry and one book of prose, Abreu has written a number of essays, and published conversations with artists and poets. Their poetry is focused on many subjects, including art, race, gender, and other topics. They have published at Rhizome, Art in America, AQNB, and elsewhere.

They are known for highly polemical essays dealing with antiblackness in culture and art. They wrote an essay about, "Online Imagined Black English," a phenomenon where users of social media users imagine the qualities of African American Vernacular English due to increased exposure to Black media, adopt it for expressive purposes that generally rely on stereotypes of Black people as lazy, criminal, cool, hypersexual, and otherwise.  They also wrote an essay about the commodifying nature of social practice art which reflects on ideas from Claire Bishop.

Art shows 
Abreu participated in group art installations at Rhizome and the New Museum (online), the Cooley Gallery (Portland), Chicken Coop Contemporary (Portland), Veronica project space (Seattle), AA/LA Gallery (Los Angeles), and the Art Gym (Marylhurst University).

Not Total, Portland Community College Paragon Gallery, Portland, OR (2019)
I Scare Easily, Yaby, Madrid (2019)
obsequies, AA|LA Gallery, Los Angeles (2018)
a re:trospective; a group show curated as part of the home school project in collaboration with the Re:Art Show; Old Pfizer Factory, Brooklyn, NY (2018)
First Look: New Black Portraitures, New Museum, NY (2017)
resilience, Institute for New Connotative Action, Seattle (2016)

Awards

Bibliography 
 Nominated for the Sarah Winnemucca Award for Creative Nonfiction 2019.

References 

1991 births
Living people
Educators from Portland, Oregon